Jacobus Antonius Peter Johannes "Jasper" Cillessen (born 22 April 1989) is a Dutch professional footballer who plays as a goalkeeper for Eredivisie club NEC and the Netherlands national team.

Cillessen joined NEC's youth team in 2001, making his professional debut for them in 2010, and signed for Ajax for €3 million a year later. He played in 141 matches for Ajax in six seasons, winning honours including three Eredivisie titles. In 2016, he joined Barcelona for an initial €13 million.

In May 2011, Cillessen received his first call-up for the Netherlands national team. He made his international debut in 2013 and was the country's first-choice goalkeeper as they finished third at the 2014 FIFA World Cup.

Club career

NEC
Cillessen was born in Nijmegen and grew up in nearby Groesbeek. He began playing for the youth team of local club De Treffers before being scouted to the NEC/FC Oss youth academy in 2001. In 2008, he signed his first professional contract with NEC and started playing for the reserves. In 2010, Cillessen agreed a new two-year contract at NEC until June 2012.

Following an injury to first-choice goalkeeper Gábor Babos, Cillessen made his senior debut on 28 August 2010 in a 2–2 home draw against SC Heerenveen and was voted the man of the match. Even when Babos returned from injury, Cillessen managed to keep his spot in the first team and signed a two-year contract extension that tied him to NEC until 2014. At the end of the 2010–11 season, Cillessen was awarded Gelderland Footballer of the Year.

Ajax

On 27 August 2011, it was announced NEC and Ajax had reached an agreement for the transfer of Cillessen to the Amsterdam club for an estimated €3 million. He signed a five-year contract, binding him to Ajax until 2016.

Cillessen made his first appearance for Ajax on 21 September 2011, in a 2nd round KNVB Cup away match against VV Noordwijk. He played the full match, conceding only to Sijbren Bartlema in the 66th minute of the 3–1 away victory. He made his first league appearance for Ajax in a 2011–12 Eredivisie match on 23 October 2011 against arch-rivals Feyenoord, coming on as a 66th-minute substitute for right back Gregory van der Wiel, after starting goalkeeper Kenneth Vermeer had been shown a red card. With Ajax down to ten men, Cillessen helped Ajax retain a 1–1 draw after Jan Vertonghen tied the match just minutes after the ejection of Vermeer.

Cillessen's breakthrough into the first team began during the 2013 pre-season. Manager Frank de Boer said both of his two leading goalkeepers would get a chance to show why they should be his first choice. Early in that season, Cillessen made his first sustained run of appearances for Ajax in the Eredivisie.

Barcelona
On 25 August 2016, Cillessen signed a five-year contract with Barcelona for an initial €13 million transfer fee plus another €2 million in add-ons, replacing the outgoing Claudio Bravo. After only three training sessions, he made his debut in a home La Liga match against Alavés, conceding twice from five attempts in a 1–2 loss.

Since his move to Barcelona in 2016, Cillessen managed to play a major role in the Copa del Rey for both the 2016–17 and 2017–18 seasons, starting 17 of 18 matches in the competition. Barcelona won the trophy in both seasons, making the club four-time consecutive Copa del Rey winners since 2014–15.

On 30 January 2019, he saved the first penalty of his professional career after 20 attempts in a 6–1 home win over Sevilla in the Copa del Rey, which enabled Barcelona to advanced to the semi-finals of the competition 6–3 on aggregate.

Valencia
On 25 June 2019, Cillessen signed a four-year contract with Valencia, for a fee of €35 million, making him the second-most expensive transfer in the history of the club. He made his debut on 17 August 2019, starting in a 1–1 home draw against Real Sociedad in La Liga.

Return to NEC
Cillessen returned to former club NEC in August 2022 having agreed a three-year contract. The transfer fee paid to Valencia was reported as "several 100,000" Euro.

International career

Youth
In October 2010, Cillessen was called-up for the Netherlands national under-21 team by the national team coach, Cor Pot, for the 2011 UEFA European Under-21 Championship qualification play-offs against Ukraine.

Senior

After the 2010–11 season, Cillessen was placed in the pre-selection for the senior Netherlands squad's friendly matches against Uruguay and Brazil. Manager Bert van Marwijk eventually selected Cillessen for the Netherlands' friendly trip to South America. On 7 May 2012, Cillessen was named in the provisional list of 36 players for the UEFA Euro 2012 tournament, one of nine uncapped players to be chosen by Van Marwijk as part of the preliminary squad.

On 7 June 2013, Cillessen obtained his first cap for the Netherlands national team under manager Louis van Gaal, after several call-ups in the past. Cillessen played the first half in a friendly encounter against Indonesia in a 3–0 away win for the Dutch. He was relieved in goal by Kenneth Vermeer in the 46th minute, as the two helped keep a clean sheet during their friendly encounter in Asia.

In June 2014, Cillessen was selected in the Netherlands' squad for the 2014 FIFA World Cup. He was given the number 1 jersey and started in the team's opening match, a 5–1 victory against Spain in Salvador. He went on to start in every match in the tournament as the Oranje took third place. However, in the quarter-final against Costa Rica, Louis van Gaal unexpectedly substituted him for Tim Krul ahead of the penalty shootout, which the Dutch team won.

Cillessen was originally selected for the Dutch squad at the Euro 2020 as their starting goalkeeper. On 1 June 2021, he was omitted from the squad due to a positive COVID-19 test. He later stated that manager De Boer had known about the virus when he was first picked, and that he was fit for play.

Career statistics

Club

International

Honours
Ajax
Eredivisie: 2011–12, 2012–13, 2013–14
Johan Cruyff Shield: 2013

Barcelona
La Liga: 2017–18, 2018–19
Copa del Rey: 2016–17, 2017–18
Supercopa de España: 2018

Netherlands
FIFA World Cup third place: 2014
UEFA Nations League runner-up: 2018–19

Individual
Gelderland Footballer of the Year: 2011
Gillette Player of the Year: 2014
Ajax Player of the Year (Rinus Michels Award): 2014–15, 2015–16

References

External links

 FC Barcelona official profile
 
 
 
 Jasper Cillessen at Voetbal International 
 Jasper Cillessen Ajax profile 

1989 births
Living people
Dutch footballers
Dutch expatriate footballers
Eredivisie players
Eerste Divisie players
NEC Nijmegen players
AFC Ajax players
Jong Ajax players
La Liga players
FC Barcelona players
Valencia CF players
People from Groesbeek
Association football goalkeepers
Netherlands international footballers
2014 FIFA World Cup players
De Treffers players
Dutch expatriate sportspeople in Spain
Expatriate footballers in Spain
Footballers from Gelderland